Chief Kehinde Sofola,  QC, SAN, MON,  CON  (10 March 1924 – 25 March 2007) was a prominent Nigerian Jurist  and Minister of Justice during the Second Nigerian Republic.

Early life and career
Chief Sofola was born on March 10, 1924, as one of the second of three sets of twins in Ogun State southwestern Nigeria.
He was called to the English bar on September 11, 1954.
He was the founder of Kehinde Sofola's Chamber a law firm in Lagos State where Ayotunde Phillips, the Chief Judge of Lagos State began her career on September 1976. He became a Senior Advocate of Nigeria in 1978.

Personal life
He was an elder brother to Idowu Sofola, the Chairman of the Nigerian Body of Benchers. His eldest son Kayode Sofola is a Senior Advocate of Nigeria and former Chairman of United Bank for Africa.

References

1924 births
2007 deaths
People from Ogun State
Lagos State judges
Kehinde Sofola
20th-century Nigerian lawyers
Senior Advocates of Nigeria
Nigerian twins
Commanders of the Order of the Niger